The 3rd constituency of the Haut-Rhin is a French legislative constituency in the Haut-Rhin département.

Description

Haut-Rhin's 3rd Constituency covers the southern portion of the département centred on the town of Altkirch however the largest town by far with the constituency is Saint-Louis, which lies close to Basel on the border with Switzerland. The constituency includes the area historically known as Sundgau. The constituency has elected Gaullist candidates for its entire history within the Fifth Republic.

The constituency was held by Jean-Luc Reitzer from 1988 until he stood down in 2022. In the 2012 election, he was elected on the first round of voting.

Historic Representation

Election results

2022

 
 
|-
| colspan="8" bgcolor="#E9E9E9"|
|-
 
 

 
 
 
 

* Striby stood as a dissident LREM member, without the support of the party or the Ensemble Citoyens coalition. His results as the LREM candidate in 2017 are counted against the official Ensemble Citoyens candidate for swing purposes.

2017

 
 
 
 
 
 
 
 
|-
| colspan="8" bgcolor="#E9E9E9"|
|-
 
 

 
 
 
 
 Source:

2012

Sources

3